David Peter Bédard (born October 23, 1965) is a retired diver from Canada, who represented his native country at four consecutive Summer Olympics, starting in 1984. He twice won a medal at the Pan American Games (1987 and 1995). He won a silver medal at the 1986 Commonwealth Games and two silver medals at the 1990 Commonwealth Games.

References

External links
 

1965 births
Canadian male divers
Commonwealth Games silver medallists for Canada
French Quebecers
Olympic divers of Canada
Divers at the 1986 Commonwealth Games
Divers at the 1990 Commonwealth Games
Divers at the 1994 Commonwealth Games
Divers at the 1984 Summer Olympics
Divers at the 1988 Summer Olympics
Divers at the 1992 Summer Olympics
Divers at the 1996 Summer Olympics
Divers at the 1995 Pan American Games
Living people
Divers from Montreal
Pan American Games bronze medalists for Canada
Commonwealth Games medallists in diving
Pan American Games medalists in diving
Divers at the 1987 Pan American Games
Medalists at the 1987 Pan American Games
Medalists at the 1995 Pan American Games
Medallists at the 1986 Commonwealth Games
Medallists at the 1990 Commonwealth Games